Nick Woltemade (born 14 February 2002) is a German professional footballer who plays as a forward or attacking midfielder for  club SV Elversberg on loan from Werder Bremen. He has represented Germany internationally at U16 and U17 youth levels.

Club career
Woltemade joined Werder Bremen in 2010 from TS Woltmershausen. In the 2018–19 season he scored 18 goals and made eight assists in 24 matches for Werder Bremen's U17 team in the U17 Bundesliga.

Having scored seven goals in eight matches for the U19 side Woltemade was first called up to the first-team squad for a Bundesliga match against Bayer Leverkusen on 11 January 2020. On 1 February 2020, he made his professional debut in a 2–1 league defeat away to FC Augsburg, becoming the youngest Bundesliga player in Werder Bremen's history at 17 years, 11 months, and 16 days.

In August 2022, Woltemade joined SV Elversberg, newly promoted to the 3. Liga, on a one-year loan.

Career statistics

References

2002 births
Footballers from Bremen
Living people
German footballers
Association football forwards
Association football midfielders
Germany youth international footballers
Bundesliga players
2. Bundesliga players
3. Liga players
Regionalliga players
SV Werder Bremen players
SV Werder Bremen II players
SV Elversberg players